Togan Arslan was a bey of the Beylik of Dilmaç

Background
After Alp Arslan of Seljukids defeated Byzantine army in the battle of Manzikert in 1071,  a series of Turkmen beyliks (principalities) were formed in Anatolia (Asiatic part of present Turkey) before Anatolia was united by the Sultanate of Rum. Beylik of Dilmaç was one of them. It was founded as an iqta of the Seljuks. Its capital was Bitlis. Togan Arslan was the second bey of this beylik.

Early years
After the death of his father Mehmet in 1104, Togan Arslan became the bey. In 1111 he captured neighboring territory. But he was only semi independent. Although initially his beylik was a vassal of the Ahlatshahs, he switched sides and became a vassal of Ilghazi of the Mardin Artukids. Together with Ilghazi, Togan Arslan participated in a number of military operations against Crusaders, the most important being Battle of Ager Sanguinis in 1119 where Roger of Salerno lost his life. Although he was also invited to participate in a campaign against the Georgians in 1121, he didn't take part in the siege which soon ended in failure.

Defending Bitlis
Three times he had to defend his capital Bitlis. In 1124 the bey of Ahlatshah from the north and in  1133 the bey of Hasankeyf Artukiks from the south laid sieges on Bitlis. In both campaigns Togan Arslan was able to defend Bitlis successfully. In 1134, Imadettin Zengi, from Mosul, one of the most powerful commanders  of the region tried to capture Bitlis. Togan Arslan paid to save the city.

Death
Togan Arslan died in 1137.

References

11th-century births
1137 deaths
Turkic rulers
Anatolian beyliks
History of Bitlis Province
12th-century Turkic people